The Moonshine Conspiracy is a collective of surfers and artists who share a certain retro sensibility. The Conspiracy was begun in 1998 by Emmett Malloy, his cousins the Malloy brothers (surfers Chris Malloy, Keith, and Dan); and former pro-surfer and musician Jack Johnson in Ventura, California. Moonshine released four films. They made a total of six.

Later, they developed a record label company, The Moonshine Conspiracy Records, to release soundtracks for Woodshed Films (owned by Jack Johnson and others). After releasing Johnson's On and On through Universal Records, the label was renamed as Brushfire Records. It was named in part after Johnson's Enjoy Records album debut.

Moonshine Festival
Held in Laguna Beach, California, the Moonshine Festival was an art, music, and film event related to surfing and named for the Malloy-led Moonshine Conspiracy. Jack Johnson, Will Oldham, the Shins, and others, such as surfer-musician Donavon Frankenreiter performed there.

Films 
 Thicker than Water (1999, Jack Johnson)
 The Seedling (1999, Thomas Campbell)
 September Sessions (2000, Jack Johnson)
 Shelter (2001)
 Sprout (2004, Thomas Campbell)
 A Brokedown Melody (2004, Chris Malloy)

See also 
 List of record labels

References

External links
 Woodshed Films Official Website (formerly themoonshineconspiracy.com)

American record labels
Record labels disestablished in 2002
Surf culture
Surfing organizations
Surfing in the United States
Surfing in California